Elena Borisovna Dobronravova (21 July 1932 – 24 January 1999) was a Soviet and Russian actress. Born July 21, 1932 in Moscow in the family of artists of the Moscow Art Theatre Boris Dobronravov (1896-1949) and Maria Yulievna Dobronravova (1900-1964). She studied at the Moscow Art Theatre School (1950-52) at the Moscow Art Theatre named after Maxim Gorky. In 1954 she graduated from the Boris Shchukin Theatre Institute (artistic director - Anna Orochko). After education Dobronravova joined the troupe of the Vakhtangov Academic Theater. Actress made her film debut in A Big Family (1954) and won Best Acting Award at 1955 Cannes Film Festival as part of ensemble. She's known for many roles in films, television and stage productions.

Elena Borisovna Dobronravova died on January 24, 1999. She was buried at the Novodevichy Cemetery near her parents.

Selected filmography

References

External links 

1932 births
1999 deaths
Soviet film actresses
Soviet stage actresses
Cannes Film Festival Award for Best Actress winners
Honored Artists of the RSFSR
Actresses from Moscow
Burials at Novodevichy Cemetery